Indira Jaising (born 3 June 1940) is an Indian lawyer and activist. In 2018, she was ranked 20th on the list of 50 Greatest Leaders of the World by Fortune magazine. She also runs Lawyers' Collective, a non-governmental organization (NGO), the license of which was permanently cancelled by the Home Ministry for violations of Foreign Contribution Regulation Act. The central government of India accused the NGO of using foreign funds in a manner not mentioned in the objectives of the NGO. The Bombay High Court later passed the order to de-freeze the domestic accounts of her NGO. The case is ongoing in the Supreme Court of India.

Early life
Jaising was born in Mumbai to a Sindhi Hindu family. She attended St. Teresa's Convent High School, Santacruz, Mumbai, at the Bishop Cotton Girls' School, Bangalore. She then earned a Bachelor of Arts from Bangalore University. In 1962, earned a Master of Laws from the University of Bombay.

In 1981, Jaising founded the Lawyers Collective with her husband Anand Grover. The organization was devoted to feminist and left-wing causes. In 1986, she became the first woman to be designated a Senior Advocate by the High Court of Bombay. In 2009, Sonia Gandhi appointed Jaising as the first female Additional Solicitor General of India. From the beginning of her legal career, she has focused on the protection of select human rights and the rights of women.

Fighting for women

Jaising argued several cases relating to discrimination against women, including Mary Roy's case, which led to the grant of equal inheritance rights for Syrian Christian women in Kerala and Rupan Deol Bajaj, the IAS officer who had prosecuted KPS Gill for outraging her modesty. This was one of the first cases of sexual harassment successfully prosecuted. Jaising also argued the case of Githa Hariharan, in which the Supreme Court decided that children could also bear the name of their mother in addition to that of their father.  Jaising also successfully challenged the discriminatory provisions of the Indian Divorce Act in the High Court of Kerala, thus enabling Christian women to get a divorce on the ground of cruelty or desertion, a right which was denied to them. She has also represented Teesta Setalvad, in a case where she was targeted and accused of embezzling money.

In 2015, Jaising argued the case for Priya Pillai in Green Peace India case. In 2016, Indira Jaising challenged the procedure for designating senior advocates in the Supreme Court.

More recently, Indira Jaising wrote a column for The Indian Express, criticizing the manner in which the Indian Supreme Court rejected Nupur Sharma's plea for consolidation of FIRs in criminal cases filed against her for allegedly defaming Prophet Mohammed. In the article, Jaising said the Supreme Court's "remarks against Sharma are uncalled for, and can prejudice low courts."

Human rights and the environment
Jaising has represented the victims of the Bhopal tragedy in the Supreme Court of India in their claim for compensation against the Union Carbide Corporation. Jaising also represented Mumbai residents who were facing eviction. Jaising has been associated with several Peoples Commissions on Violence in Punjab to investigate the extra judicial killings, disappearances and mass cremations that took place during the period 1979 to 1990. The United Nations appointed Jaising and to a fact-finding mission investigating the alleged murder, rape and torture by security forces against Rohingya Muslims in Myanmar's Rakhine state.

A keen environmentalist, Jaising has also argued major environmental cases in the Supreme Court.

Lawyers Collective
Jaising later became the founder secretary of the Lawyers Collective, an organization that provides legal funding for the underprivileged sections of Indian society. She founded a monthly magazine called The Lawyers, in 1986, which focuses on social justice and women's issues in the context of Indian law. She has been involved in cases related to the discrimination against women, the Muslim Personal Law, rights of pavement dwellers and the homeless and the Bhopal gas tragedy. She has fought against child labor, for the economic rights of women, estranged wives and domestic violence cases. The NGO currently has had its license suspended for violating the FCRA norms.

Other
Jaising has attended several national and international conferences on women and represented her country at these conferences. Her NGO has been barred by the MHA (Ministry of Home Affairs) from receiving foreign funds. The NGO Lawyers' Collective has had their license suspended for violation of foreign funding norms. However, the Bombay HC has ordered to defreeze the domestic accounts of her NGO.

She had a fellowship at the Institute of Advanced Legal Studies London and has been a visiting Scholar at the Columbia University New York. She was a member of the United Nations Committee on the Elimination of Discrimination against Women. She was conferred with the Rotary Manav Seva Award in recognition of her services to the nation in fighting corruption and as a champion of the weaker sections of the society.

She was given the Padma Shree by the President of India in 2005 for her service to the cause of public affairs. Her husband Anand Grover is a human rights lawyer and designated senior advocate of the Supreme Court.

References

External links
 Woman Against Family - blog entry by Jaising written on the first anniversary of the domestic violence act
Contempt, the flavour of the season- Indira Jaising writes: Why Attorney General and the Central Government's contempt of court petitions against Advocate Prashant Bhushan stand on thin ice

Scholars from Mumbai
1940 births
Living people
United Nations Committee on the Elimination of Discrimination against Women members
Indian solicitors
Recipients of the Padma Shri in public affairs
Additional Solicitors General of India
Indian women's rights activists
Indian women activists
Indian women educational theorists
20th-century Indian educational theorists
Indian feminists
Activists from Maharashtra
Women educators from Maharashtra
Women scientists from Maharashtra
Educators from Maharashtra
Indian officials of the United Nations
20th-century women educators
20th-century Indian lawyers
20th-century Indian women lawyers
21st-century Indian lawyers
21st-century Indian women lawyers
Supreme Court of India lawyers
Senior Advocates in India